The Ministry of Justice and Human Rights of the Democratic Republic of Congo (Congo-Kinshasa) has the following duties:

 Administration of justice 
 Exercise of the regulatory power
 Control of Judicial Activities
 General supervision of judicial personnel
 Keeping seals and monitoring institutional reforms
Overseeing the prison system's operations

The ministry exercises the rights conferred by the Code of Organization and Judicial Jurisdiction, Law on the Status of Magistrates, and the Penal and Civil Procedure Codes.

 During the course of its history, the country was known as Zaire. Most recently, in 2010, the Ministry of Human Rights merged with the Ministry of Justice.

List of ministers 

Rémy Mwamba (1960)
Marcel Lihau (1960–1961)
Rémy Mwamba (1961–1962)
Jean-Chrysostome Weregemere (1962)
Justin Marie Bomboko (1963-1965)
N'Singa Udjuu (1966-1968)
Étienne Tshisekedi (1968-1969)
 Thomas Lwango (1969)
 Bruno Ndala (1969-1970)
 Muyembe Kanza Tshibangu (1972)
 A'Dokpe Lingo Nzondomio (1973-1974) [referred to as the State Commissioner for Justice]
 Kabuita Nyamabu (1975-1976) [referred to as the State Commissioner for Justice]
Mulenda Shamwenge Mutebi (1976-1977) [referred to as the State Commissioner for Justice]
Mampuya Kanunk' a-Tshiabo (1977) [referred to as the State Commissioner for Justice]
Mozagba Ngbuka Bamangwa (1980-1981) [referred to as the State Commissioner for Justice]
Inonga Lokongo L'Ome (1981-1982) [referred to as the State Commissioner for Justice]
Vunduawe Te Pamako (1982) [referred to as the State Commissioner for Justice]
Mazanga Ngbuka Bomanga (1983) [referred to as the State Commissioner for Justice]
Gerard Kamanda Wa Kamanda (1984) [referred to as the State Commissioner for Justice]
Bayona Ba Meya (1984-1985) [referred to as the State Commissioner for Justice]
Mobutu Sese Seko (1985-1986) [referred to as the State Commissioner for Justice]
Singa Udjuu (1986-1988) [referred to as the State Commissioner for Justice]
Mayabo Nkulu (1991)
Mokuba (1992)
Roger Glaanga (1993)
Gerard Kamanda Wa Kamanda (1994)
N'Singa Udjuu (1994-1997)
Celestin Lwangi (1997-1998)
 Mwenze Kongolo (1998-2001)
 Ngele Masudi (2001-2003)
 Honorius Kisimba Ngoy (2003-2006)
 Pierre Ilunga Bundu wa Biluba (2006-2007)
Mutombo Bakafwa Nsenda (2007-2008)
Luzolo Bambi Lessa (2008-2012)
Wivine Mumba Matipa (2012-2015)
Alexis Thambwe Mwamba (2016–present)

See also 

 Justice ministry
 Democratic Republic of Congo

References 

Justice ministries
Justice